The Pony Club Association of New South Wales is the controlling body for Pony Clubs in New South Wales (NSW) where young people can ride and learn all disciplines of equestrian sports. The Association co-ordinates, develops and promotes Pony Clubs in New South Wales and instruction for its members.

Children and young adults up to the age of 25 have the opportunity to learn the skills of riding and general horsemanship and compete at both state, national and international events. It is one of the few sports were males and females compete on equal terms.

PCANSW is divided into 27 Zones comprising approximately 250 Clubs. Each Zone has its own Committee and a Zone Chief Instructor whose duty it is to supervise and encourage the instruction policy within the Zone. Each Zone sends Councillors to Association meetings to determine general policy.

Australia has the largest Pony Club membership in the world with just under 40,000 financial members. PCANSW is the largest of all the Member States of Pony Club Australia, with approximately 12,000 members at the end of 2019.

In each Zone there are as many as 15 different Pony Clubs, some larger than others.

Pony Club is a fun way for children to learn to ride while having fun and making friends.

Aims and objectives
 To encourage young people to ride and learn to enjoy all kinds of sport connected with horses and riding
 To provide instruction on riding and horsemanship and to instill in the members the proper care of their animals
 To promote the highest ideals of sportsmanship, citizenship and loyalty, thereby cultivating strength of character and self-discipline.

Pony Club camp
The highlight of the Pony Club calendar for many children is the annual Pony Club Camp, organised by the club or zone. This allows for all members to spend additional time with their mounts, often in a new setting doing a variety of activities, including cross country as well as the typical mounted games.

Membership
Membership is open to anyone who is not considered a professional under the Association rules. Junior members are under 17 years, Associate members are 17 and under 25 years and Senior Members are 25 years and over. Only Junior and Associate members are allowed to compete at state level. In March 2019 the Association voted to allow members 25 years and older (Senior Members) the opportunity to ride, compete and receive instruction at a club level (clubs must have held a meeting and voted to accept this).

Activities in Pony Club
Rally Days
There are different activities for participation at a rally day including campdrafting, showjumping, dressage, cross country, troop drill, mounted games, sporting, polocrosse, horse care and theory. These days can be mounted or unmounted. Each clubs Rally Day differs slightly.

Certificates
Throughout their Pony Club career, riders are encouraged to undertake various efficiency tests according to their age and ability, commencing with the basic ‘E’ test through to ‘A’ test which is the highest level. These certificates aim to encourage the interest and improvement in knowledge of its members. They are viewed as a measure of a rider’s progress in their overall efficiency. In working for them riders acquire valuable knowledge and skills, which enhance their riding experience.

Competitions
To supplement Rally Days there are other activities are offered such as gymkhanas, camps, trail rides, lectures and films, visits to places of interest and demonstrations. Inter-club competitions are often held in the form of a gymkhana, which has a mix of show riding events, sporting and showjumping competitions.

Zone championships are generally held once a year for most disciplines, including but not limited to dressage, show jumping, one-day eventing, sporting, flat teams, and mounted games.

State Championships are held at roughly the same times each year.
 January - State Camp, Dressage, Showriding 
 April - Sporting, Campdrafting and Team Penning
 July - Showjumping, Jumping Equitation
 October - Mounted Games, Team Sporting
 October - One Day Event, Combined Training

State Camp is held each year for the top 12 riders in the State in their chosen discipline being dressage, showjumping, eventing, horsemanship, sporting and mounted games. These riders come together at The Sydney International Equestrian Centre, Horsley Park, and are instructed by top Australian coaches. The Camp promotes the aims and objects of Pony Club. Applications close 1 November each year.

Dress regulations
Each member is required to wear the following at all times, while mounted:

 Well fitting approved equestrian helmet - see Section 7 of the Associations Handbook for full details https://www.pcansw.org.au/policies/pca-handbook
 Smooth soled elastic sided riding boots -  These need to have elastic sides (they can not be lace or zip up boots, only riders over 17yo may wear long boots.)see Section 7 of the Associations Handbook for full details https://www.pcansw.org.au/policies/pca-handbook

Each club has its own uniform. Generally an informal uniform for club rally days (i.e. a club polo shirt) and have a formal uniform, consisting of a long-sleeved shirt, tie, and jumper or vest. Each club also has their own saddle cloth.

Each Zone and State also has their own colours and uniforms.

Some examples
Geary's Gap Pony Club: Jade and lemon.
Kambah Pony Club: Black, white, and mustard yellow.
Michaelago Pony Club: Light blue, black, and red.
Wamboin Pony Club: Dark blue and white.
Canberra Lakes Pony Club: Bottle Green, Yellow and White.
 Wallsend New lambton Pony Club: Red jumper, red/blue striped tie, white saddle blanket with blue and red trim

Pony Club mounts
Ownership of a horse or pony is not required for membership, but arrangements for obtaining a suitable mount must be made on an individual basis.

It doesn't matter if you have a horse or a pony, so long as the mount is suitable according to Pony Club policy. The word "pony" in Pony Club comes from the British Pony Club and was originally used to refer to the size of the rider, not to the size of the horse.

Example: Zone 16
Zone 16 comprises the Pony Clubs in the Australian Capital Territory and surrounding areas. There are 14 Pony Clubs in Zone 16. Here they are:

Belconnen Pony Club.
Bungedore Pony Club.
Burra Pony Club.
Canberra Lakes Pony Club. - www.clpc.com.au
Canberra Riding Club.
Geary's Gap Pony Club.
Hall Pony Club.
Kambah Pony Club.
Michaelago Pony Club.
Murrumbateman Pony Club.
Queanbeyan Pony Club.
Sutton Pony Club.
Wamboin Pony Club.
Yass Pony Club.

Each of these Clubs has its own meeting place, uniforms, shows, rally/training days, sponsors, and committees.

Meeting places
There are no two Pony Clubs on the same grounds.  Some Pony Clubs such as Bungendore and Yass use their local showgrounds. Others like the Canberra Riding Club and Kambah Pony Club have their own grounds which belong to the Pony Club. Whilst other Pony Clubs, such as Canberra Lakes, use special horse grounds like Equestrian Park in Canberra's suburb of Yarralumla.

See also
Pony Club
Pony Club Australia
Pony Club Association of Victoria

References

External links
Pony Club Association of New South Wales Official Website
Pony Club Australia Official Website

Equestrian organizations
Sports governing bodies in New South Wales